Nieuwlande is a drowned village in the Dutch province of Zeeland. It was located 500 metres from the dike of the present-day Zuid-Beveland, north of Krabbendijke. Today some ruins are clearly visible on satellite pictures.

The small remaining part of the former domain of Nieuwlande was a separate municipality until 1816, when it was merged with Krabbendijke.

Nieuwlande has a coat of arms and a flag (an armorial banner). They depict a red down-turned crescent on a white field, with six green and white wavy lines underneath.

References

Former municipalities of Zeeland
Former populated places in the Netherlands
Reimerswaal (municipality)